Jorge Ruiz Cabestany (born 22 November 1956) is a Spanish racing cyclist. He rode in the 1981 Tour de France.

References

External links
 

1956 births
Living people
Spanish male cyclists
Sportspeople from San Sebastián
Cyclists from the Basque Country (autonomous community)